Head V is a 1949 painting by Irish-born British artist Francis Bacon, one of series of works made in 1949 for his first one-man exhibition at the Hanover Gallery, in London.  It measures  and is held in a private collection.

The painting is part of a series of six works from the late 1940s depicting heads. Like Head II, the work depicts a distorted head in a space in a space shrouded with vertical bands interpreted as curtains, with several safety pins in the curtains.

Bacon's six Head paintings were first exhibited at the Hanover Gallery in 1949, alongside four other important early works by Bacon: Three Studies for Figures at the Base of a Crucifixion, Figure in a landscape, Study from the Human Body (also known as Study for Figure) and Study for Portrait (also known as Man in a Blue Box). 

It has been described as one of the most elusive images produced by Bacon and also as the most abstract or indistinct picture of the series.  It has not been exhibited since 1958, and was owned by a private collector in Switzerland in 1964.

References

Sources
Dawson, Barbara; Sylvester, David. Francis Bacon in Dublin. London: Thames & Hudson, 2000. 
Farr, Dennis; Peppiatt, Michael; Yard, Sally. Francis Bacon: A Retrospective. NY: Harry N Abrams, 1999. 
Peppiatt, Michael. Anatomy of an Enigma. London: Westview Press, 1996. 
Russell, John. Francis Bacon (World of Art). NY: Norton, 1971.

External links
 Head V (1949), francis-bacon.com
 Head V, 1949, Artimage
 Wyndham Lewis and Francis Bacon, Jan Cox

1949 paintings
Paintings by Francis Bacon